Taschenbergpalais is a palace hotel owned by the Kempinski Group. It is located on Sophie Street next to the Dresden Castle and in front of the Zwinger. In direct proximity are the Semperoper, the Theaterplatz (theatre square) and the Dresden Cathedral.
The facade of the Hotel Taschenbergpalais as well as the staircase on the inside of the building are designed historically whereas the interior in general is designed rather modern.

History
When the architect, Johann Friedrich Karcher, commenced building the Taschenbergpalais in 1705, he followed the design of previous buildings. The Taschenbergpalais was the palace of Anna Constantia von Brockdorff, later Countess of Cosel and one of Augustus II's mistresses. After Anna Constantia von Hoym was banned by Augustus II in 1713, the Taschenbergpalais was renovated and named "Turkish Palais".
From 1718 to 1720, the Palais was expanded several times for the crown prince family by Matthäus Daniel Pöppelmann and Raymond Leplat. The two fountains next to the entrance were constructed from 1747 to 1750 by Johann Christoph Knöffel. The fountains were restored in 1990, and copies were set up next to the entrance while the Taschenbergpalais was being rebuilt. The last expansion was added in 1843 to the south eastern part of the building.

After being extensively restored in 1934, Taschenbergpalais was subsequently destroyed in 1945 by the bombing of Dresden. It remained in that state for nearly half a century until reconstruction started in 1992, using original models and remains. Reconstruction was completed in 1995 at a cost of 127.8 million euros, and on March 31, 1995, the Hotel Taschenbergpalais Kempinski Dresden was opened up as the first five-star hotel in Saxony.

Features
The hotel features 213 rooms and suites as well as the Palais Bistro restaurant, the Café Vestibül coffeehouse located next to the historical staircase, and the Karl May Bar. Furthermore, the hotel contains a spa area with a pool, steam bath, sauna, fitness center, and massage treatments.

Awards
As of 2009, the hotel was a member of The Leading Hotels of the World.  In 1995 it was lauded as the best new hotel in Germany and in 2008 it was declared the fourth-best German hotel on the international Top 500 list of hotels. The hotel reached second place behind the Ritz-Carlton Berlin in a list of the best business hotels in Germany by the financial magazine Euro am Sonntag.

Prominent Guests
On June 4, 2009, the 44th President of the United States of America Barack Obama stayed at the hotel during his visit to Dresden.  Other visitors include politicians such as Horst Köhler, Vladimir Putin, Jacques Chirac, Helmut Schmidt, and Gerhard Schröder, royalty such as Margrethe II of Denmark, Beatrix of the Netherlands, and Prince Albert II of Monaco, and artists like Günter Grass, Thomas Gottschalk, Karl Lagerfeld and Anna Netrebko.

In June 2016, the 2016 Bilderberg Conference was held at the hotel.

External links

 Hotel Taschenbergpalais Kempinski Dresden, official website
 History of the Taschenberg Palais

Hotels in Germany
Buildings and structures in Dresden
Baroque architecture in Dresden
Kempinski Hotels
Hotels established in 1995
1995 establishments in Germany
Houses completed in 1708
Rebuilt buildings and structures in Dresden
18th-century architecture in Germany